Sigita Mažeikaitė-Strečen (née Mažeikaitė, born September 24, 1958 in Panevėžys, Lithuanian SSR) is a former Lithuanian handball player who competed in the 1980 Summer Olympics.

In 1980 she won the gold medal with the Soviet team. She played four matches including the final and scored two goals.

External links
profile

1958 births
Living people
Soviet female handball players
Lithuanian female handball players
Handball players at the 1980 Summer Olympics
Olympic handball players of the Soviet Union
Olympic gold medalists for the Soviet Union
Olympic medalists in handball
Sportspeople from Panevėžys
Medalists at the 1980 Summer Olympics